Ian Glover (born 8 November 1978) is a former professional snooker player from Doncaster. He practises at the Jeff Cundy snooker centre in Scunthorpe and the Sheffield Star Snooker Academy. His practice partners are the club's owner Jeff Cundy, retired professional Barry West, Ben Woollaston and Stuart Carrington.

Career
Glover first entered Main Tour for the 1995–96 season for the first of three seasons in the 1990s; however, he had little success and only won £50 from the last 128 of the Masters Qualifying Event in 1998. After dropping of the tour in 1999, Glover took a hiatus from 2001 before returning to snooker in 2009, playing the secondary Pontins International Open Series tour, Glover finished the season 43rd in the Order of Merit with his best result being a quarter final defeat to Alfie Burden in the second event. Glover reached the last 16 of the 2009 Six-red World Championship, with a notable 5–4 win over Ricky Walden in the last 32.

For 2010–11, the PIOS was dropped and replaced by the pro-am Players Tour Championship and Glover enjoyed success in these events, with notable wins over former two times World Champion Mark Williams and top 32 player Marcus Campbell, wins which helped him reach the last 64 stage of Event 3 and last 32 of Event 4 respectively; however, these runs were not enough to earn him a place back on the professional tour at the end of the season and he failed to win place through the 2011 Q School also. He however did qualify for the main qualifying stages of the 2010 World Open after qualifying from Leicester Riley's Club. He lost 3–1 to Anthony McGill in the first qualifying round.

From 2011 to 2014 Glover continued to enter PTC events but failed to advance beyond the last 128 stage and failed to win prize money. Glover however did return to the tour in 2014 for the 2014–15 and 2015–16 seasons after winning a two-year card in the EBSA Play-offs beating Gareth Allen and Jamie Clarke both 4–2.

In the 2014/15 season Glover twice reached the last 32 of the PTC events (AT1 and ET1); however, in the major tournaments he failed to win a single match.

Glover began the 2015/2016 season positively, with a 5–0 victory over promising amateur Ross Higgins in the Australian Open, but lost in the next qualifying round 3–5 to Kyren Wilson. He overcame another amateur, Xu Yuan, in the Haining Open, but followed this 4–2 win with a loss to Thanawat Thirapongpaiboon in the last 64. At the UK Championship, he led Jamie Jones 4–3, but could not prevent a 4–6 defeat; his 2016 German Masters qualifying campaign ended similarly, Glover taking the first frame but losing 1–5 to the resurgent John Higgins.

Performance and rankings timeline

References

External links
 Profile on worldsnooker.com
 
 Profile on Pro Snooker Blog

English snooker players
Sportspeople from Doncaster
1978 births
Living people